In Vapnik–Chervonenkis theory, the Vapnik–Chervonenkis (VC) dimension is a measure of the capacity (complexity, expressive power, richness, or flexibility) of a set of functions that can be learned by a statistical binary classification algorithm. It is defined as the cardinality of the largest set of points that the algorithm can shatter, which means the algorithm can always learn a perfect classifier for any labeling of at least one configuration of those data points. It was originally defined by Vladimir Vapnik and Alexey Chervonenkis.

Informally, the capacity of a classification model is related to how complicated it can be. For example, consider the thresholding of a high-degree polynomial: if the polynomial evaluates above zero, that point is classified as positive, otherwise as negative. A high-degree polynomial can be wiggly, so it can fit a given set of training points well. But one can expect that the classifier will make errors on other points, because it is too wiggly. Such a polynomial has a high capacity. A much simpler alternative is to threshold a linear function. This function may not fit the training set well, because it has a low capacity. This notion of capacity is made rigorous below.

Definitions

VC dimension of a set-family 

Let  be a set family (a set of sets) and  a set. Their intersection is defined as the following set family:

VC dimension of a classification model 
A binary classification model  with some parameter vector  is said to shatter a set of generally positioned data points  if, for every assignment of labels to those points, there exists a  such that the model  makes no errors when evaluating that set of data points.

The VC dimension of a model  is the maximum number of points that can be arranged so that  shatters them.

Examples 
1.  is a constant classifier (with no parameters); Its VC dimension is 0 since it cannot shatter even a single point. In general, the VC dimension of a finite classification model, which can return at most  different classifiers, is at most  (this is an upper bound on the VC dimension; the Sauer–Shelah lemma gives a lower bound on the dimension).

For every point , a classifier  labels it as 0 if  and labels it as 1 if . (b) It cannot shatter all the sets with two points. For every set of two numbers, if the smaller is labeled 1, then the larger must also be labeled 1, so not all labelings are possible.

3.  is a single-parametric interval classifier on real numbers; i.e, for a certain parameter , the classifier  returns 1 if the input number is in the interval  and 0 otherwise. E.g, for every set , a classifier  labels it as (0,0) if  or if , as (1,0) if , as (1,1) if , and as (0,1) if .
(b) It cannot shatter any set of three points. For every set of three numbers, if the smallest and the largest are labeled 1, then the middle one must also be labeled 1, so not all labelings are possible.

4.  is a straight line as a classification model on points in a two-dimensional plane (this is the model used by a perceptron). The line should separate positive data points from negative data points. There exist sets of 3 points that can indeed be shattered using this model (any 3 points that are not collinear can be shattered). However, no set of 4 points can be shattered: by Radon's theorem, any four points can be partitioned into two subsets with intersecting convex hulls, so it is not possible to separate one of these two subsets from the other. Thus, the VC dimension of this particular classifier is 3. It is important to remember that while one can choose any arrangement of points, the arrangement of those points cannot change when attempting to shatter for some label assignment. Note, only 3 of the 23 = 8 possible label assignments are shown for the three points.

5.  is a single-parametric sine classifier,  i.e, for a certain parameter , the classifier  returns 1 if the input number  has  and 0 otherwise.

Uses

In statistical learning theory 
The VC dimension can predict a probabilistic upper bound on the test error of a classification model. Vapnik proved that the probability of the test error (i.e., risk with 0-1 loss function) distancing from an upper bound (on data that is drawn i.i.d. from the same distribution as the training set) is given by:

When  is larger, the test-error may be much higher than the training-error. This is due to overfitting).

The VC dimension also appears in sample-complexity bounds. A space of binary functions with VC dimension  can be learned with:

Thus, the sample-complexity is a linear function of the VC dimension of the hypothesis space.

In computational geometry 
The VC dimension is one of the critical parameters in the size of ε-nets, which determines the complexity of approximation algorithms based on them; range sets without finite VC dimension may not have finite ε-nets at all.

Bounds 
0.

1. The VC dimension of a finite set-family  is at most . This is because  by definition.

2. Then:

3. Given a set-family  and an element , define  where  denotes symmetric set difference. Then:

VC dimension of a finite projective plane 
A finite projective plane of order n is a collection of n2 + n + 1 sets (called "lines") over n2 + n + 1 elements (called "points"), for which:

 Each line contains exactly n + 1 points.
 Each line intersects every other line in exactly one point.
 Each point is contained in exactly n + 1 lines.
 Each point is in exactly one line in common with every other point.
 At least four points do not lie in a common line.

The VC dimension of a finite projective plane is 2.

Proof: (a) For each pair of distinct points, there is one line that contains both of them, lines that contain only one of them, and lines that contain none of them, so every set of size 2 is shattered. (b) For any triple of three distinct points, if there is a line x that contain all three, then there is no line y that contains exactly two (since then x and y would intersect in two points, which is contrary to the definition of a projective plane). Hence, no set of size 3 is shattered.

VC dimension of a boosting classifier 

Formally, given  classifiers  and a weight vector , we can define the following classifier:

VC dimension of a neural network 

A neural network is described by a directed acyclic graph G(V,E), where:
 V is the set of nodes. Each node is a simple computation cell. 
 E is the set of edges, Each edge has a weight. 
 The input to the network is represented by the sources of the graph – the nodes with no incoming edges.
 The output of the network is represented by the sinks of the graph – the nodes with no outgoing edges.
 Each intermediate node gets as input a weighted sum of the outputs of the nodes at its incoming edges, where the weights are the weights on the edges.
 Each intermediate node outputs a certain increasing function of its input, such as the sign function or the sigmoid function. This function is called the activation function.

The VC dimension of a neural network is bounded as follows:
 If the activation function is the sign function and the weights are general, then the VC dimension is at most .
 If the activation function is the sigmoid function and the weights are general, then the VC dimension is at least  and at most .
 If the weights come from a finite family (e.g. the weights are real numbers that can be represented by at most 32 bits in a computer), then, for both activation functions, the VC dimension is at most .

Generalizations 
The VC dimension is defined for spaces of binary functions (functions to {0,1}). Several generalizations have been suggested for spaces of non-binary functions.

 For multi-class functions (e.g., functions to {0,...,n-1}), the Natarajan dimension can be used. Ben David et al present a generalization of this concept.
 For real-valued functions (e.g., functions to a real interval, [0,1]), Pollard's pseudo-dimension can be used.
 The Rademacher complexity provides similar bounds to the VC, and can sometimes provide more insight than VC dimension calculations into such statistical methods such as those using kernels.
 The Memory Capacity (sometimes Memory Equivalent Capacity) gives a lower bound capacity, rather than an upper bound (see for example: Artificial_neural_network#Capacity) and therefore indicates the point of potential overfitting.

See also

Growth function
Sauer–Shelah lemma, a bound on the number of sets in a set system in terms of the VC dimension.
Karpinski–Macintyre theorem, a bound on the VC dimension of general Pfaffian formulas.

Footnotes

References 
 
 
 
  (containing information also for VC dimension)
 
 
 
 
 
 
 

Dimension
Statistical classification
Computational learning theory
Measures of complexity